Lam Hok Hei (born 18 September 1991 in Hong Kong) is a Hong Kong professional footballer who currently plays as a forward for Hong Kong Premier League club Rangers.

Club career

Rangers
Lam started his professional football career in Hong Kong 09. In 2008, he signed for Rangers. He quickly established himself as a regular first team member. In January 2013, Rangers' manager Philip Lee said that he would let Lam make the decision about his own future.

Persija Jakarta
On 18 May 2013, Lam announced that he had joined Indonesia Super League club Persija Jakarta for a four-month loan contract.

On 26 May 2013, Lam made his line-up debut for Persija Jakarta against Persidafon Dafonsoro, and he played for about 70 minutes before being injured. Persija Jakarta won, 1–0.

On 1 June 2013, Lam made his second appearance, against Persiwa Wamena; in this match, Lam made his first assist, on a goal by Rachmat Afandi, and Persija Jakarta won, 3–0.

South China
Lam scored his first goal for South China in the 2015 AFC Cup.

Eastern
Following Eastern's 2016–17 season playoff win, chairman Peter Leung announced that the club had signed Lam from South China.

Rangers
On 23 September 2019, Lam was loaned to Rangers for a season. He officially joined the club after the end of the 2019–20 season.

Lam was in good form at the start of the 2020–21 season, scoring 4 goals in 7 appearances including 1 league goal and 3 cup goals.

On 4 August 2022, Lam returned to Rangers.

International career
Lam scored his first international goal for Hong Kong on 14 November 2012 in the match against Malaysia at the Shah Alam Stadium. The game ended 1–1.

Career statistics

Club
As of 31 May 2014

International
As of 28 March 2015

References

External links
 
 
 

1991 births
Living people
Hong Kong footballers
Fourway Athletics players
Eastern Sports Club footballers
South China AA players
Hong Kong Rangers FC players
Hong Kong First Division League players
Hong Kong Premier League players
Liga 1 (Indonesia) players
Persija Jakarta players
Expatriate footballers in Indonesia
Hong Kong expatriate footballers
Hong Kong international footballers
Footballers at the 2010 Asian Games
Footballers at the 2014 Asian Games
Association football forwards
Asian Games competitors for Hong Kong
Hong Kong League XI representative players